The North Coast Steam Navigation Company was a shipping company that operated in Australia, formed as the Grafton Steam Navigation Company in 1855. The company was later renamed the Clarence & Richmond River Steam Navigation Company before being renamed in December 1888 as the Clarence, Richmond & Macleay River Steam Navigation Company.

On 13 August 1891 the company merged with John See and Company and was renamed as the North Coast Steam Navigation Company and was based in Sydney. In 1920 the company merged with Allan Taylor & Company and continued to operate the fleets under their own names. The company acquired Langley Bros in 1925 and bought the remaining fleet of the Coastal Co-Operative Steamship Company in 1929. The company further acquired the Port Stephens Steamship Company in 1940.

Many of the company's vessels were requisitioned by the Royal Australian Navy during World War II, and two ships were lost due to enemy action. On 29 April 1943  was torpedoed and sunk off Crescent Head, New South Wales, killing 32 of her 35 crew.  was destroyed by fire in 1945 while serving with the US Army small fleet in the Pacific islands.

The company traded until 1954, when it went into voluntary liquidation due to rising costs and unfavourable industrial conditions.

List of ships
Burringbar
Canonbar
Coombar
Comara, coaster built by Harland and Wolff, completed 7 April 1937
Gunbar
Maianbar
William the Fourth
Wollongbar (1911)
Wollongbar (1922)

References

1954 disestablishments in Australia
Defunct shipping companies of Australia
Northern Rivers
Australian companies established in 1855
Transport companies established in 1855